The 67th Directors Guild of America Awards, honoring the outstanding directorial achievements in films, documentary and television in 2014, were presented on February 7, 2015 at the Hyatt Regency Century Plaza. The ceremony was hosted by Jane Lynch for the second time. The nominees for the feature film category were announced on January 13, 2015 and the nominations for directing achievements in television, documentaries and commercials were announced on January 14, 2015.

Winners and nominees

Film

Television

Commercials

Lifetime Achievement in Television
 James Burrows
 Robert Butler

Frank Capra Achievement Award
 Phillip M. Goldfarb

Franklin J. Schaffner Achievement Award
 Julie E. Gelfand

References

External links
 

Directors Guild of America Awards
2014 film awards
2014 television awards
2014 in American cinema
2014 in American television
2015 awards in the United States